8th NSFC Awards
January 4, 1974

Best Film: 
 Day for Night 
The 8th National Society of Film Critics Awards, given on 4 January 1974, honored the best filmmaking of 1973.

Winners

Best Picture 
Day for Night (La nuit américaine)

Best Director 
François Truffaut – Day for Night (La nuit américaine)

Best Actor 
Marlon Brando – Last Tango in Paris (Ultimo tango a Parigi)

Best Actress 
Liv Ullmann – The New Land (Nybyggarna)

Best Supporting Actor 
Robert De Niro – Mean Streets

Best Supporting Actress 
Valentina Cortese – Day for Night (La nuit américaine)

Best Screenplay 
George Lucas, Gloria Katz and Willard Huyck – American Graffiti

Best Cinematography 
Vilmos Zsigmond – The Long Goodbye

Special Awards 
Tomás Gutiérrez Alea – Memories of Underdevelopment (Memorias del subdesarrollo)
Daryl Duke
Robert Ryan – The Iceman Cometh

References

External links
Past Awards

1973
National Society of Film Critics Awards
National Society of Film Critics Awards
National Society of Film Critics Awards